Sheena Chohan is an Indian feature film, web series and theatre actress who was born in the Punjab but brought up in Kolkata. She was crowned "Miss Kolkata" and participated in beauty pageant I Am She–Miss Universe India, where she won the title "I Am Voice". Chohan was a theatre actress in various productions including working for five years in Delhi with legendary director Arvind Gaur and many other eminent directors before she was cast as the lead female role in the Malayalam film The Train. She has played the lead in seven feature films, three of which were helmed by national award-winning directors.

Soon, she will be seen playing a social media journalist in City of Dreams on Disney Hotstar and will also be seen as an PR Manager to Madhuri Dixit on a new Netflix show The Fame Game. Her next series, about to be released, is a comedy drama on MX Player, in which she plays the lead.

Career
She made her film debut with the Malayalam film The Train co-starring Mammootty and directed by Jayaraj. The film was released in June 2011.

In 2012, she acted in the Hindi films, Mukti and Patralekha, directed by Buddhadev Dasgupta, Both the movies were based on Rabindranath Tagore's poems. and in 2014, she was the lead protagonist "Rima" in Mostofa Sarwar Farooki's film Ant Story. The film made a world premiere at the Dubai International Film Festival in December 2013. In 2014, she was nominated for the best actress award at the Dubai and Shanghai International Film Festival for her performance in the Bangladeshi film "Ant Story".

In 2016, she played one of the lead roles in the feature film Justice, directed by Bappaditya Bandopadhyay. Next, she acted in the feature film Krishnogohobor in which she plays a scientist. In the same year, she spent six months in Hollywood, acting in short films and taking acting classes.

Sheena acted in the role of a journalist in the 2017 Hollywood web comedy Words which also features American stand-up comedian and actor Jim Meskimen.

In 2019, Sheena was selected to feature in the Hollywood film Nomad by award-winning director Taron Lexton.

She has been the Youth for Human Rights Ambassador for South Asia. In 2019, she received the Human Rights Hero Award at the United Nations 16th International Human Rights Summit, where she was also a speaker.

As an actress, she has worked with brands like Sony Bravia, Wella, Make-up Art Cosmetics and Videocon.

Sheena is currently working on a new web series directed by Nagesh Kukunoor for Hotstar.

Filmography

Short films

Web series

Awards

References

External links
 
 

Actresses from Kolkata
Indian beauty pageant winners
Living people
Year of birth missing (living people)
Indian film actresses
Actresses in Bengali cinema
Actresses in Hindi cinema
Actresses in Malayalam cinema
21st-century Indian actresses